Church End is the name of several ancient hamlets (or "Ends" in local parlance) located in Bedfordshire:

 Church End, Kensworth –  TL0318
 Church End, Totternhoe –  SP9921
 Church End, Milton Bryan –  SP9832
 Church End, Arlesey –  TL1937
 Church End, Husborne Crawley –  SP9536
 Church End, Tempsford –  TL1653
 Church End, Ravensden –  TL0754
 Church End, Renhold –  TL0875
 Church End, Thurleigh –  TL0558

See also
 Haynes Church End
 Church End (disambiguation)